George Tobias (July 14, 1901 – February 27, 1980) was an American theater, film and television actor. He had character parts and supporting roles in several major films of Hollywood's Golden Age. He is also known for his role as Abner Kravitz on the TV sitcom Bewitched from 1964 to 1971.

Early life
Born in New York on July 14, 1901, Tobias was the younger of two sons born to Russian-Jewish immigrants Samuel and Esther—aka Nettie—Tobias, both of whom were active in the Yiddish theatre, as was his older brother Benjamin. Far removed fom the stereotypical stage parent, both Mr. and Mrs. Tobias did their utmost to discourage the acting bug in their youngest:
[T]hey made up their minds very definitely that I was not going to spend my life nearly starving as they did. They wanted me to be a doctor or lawyer, but I knew from a very early age that I would follow the same career as my mother, father and brother[...] So whenever I got an acting job in between my other jobs, I had to keep it secret from my family.

Career 
Tobias began acting at age 15, at New York's Neighborhood Playhouse. He appeared in Eugene O'Neill's The Hairy Ape in 1922, and in Charles Méré's La Flamme and Channing Pollock's The Fool the following year, before making his Broadway debut in Maxwell Anderson's What Price Glory? in 1924.

In 1939, he signed with Warner Bros. and was cast in supporting roles, many times along with James Cagney, in such movies as Cagney's Yankee Doodle Dandy (1942), as well as with Gary Cooper in  Sergeant York (1941) and Irving Berlin, Ronald Reagan, and George Murphy in This Is the Army (1943). In 1950, he was cast against type as a ruthless killer and felon in the film noir Southside 1-1000.

During the 1959 television season Tobias was a regular on the Hudson's Bay series, playing Pierre Falcon.

Tobias portrayed Penrose in eight episodes of the ABC program Adventures in Paradise (1959–1961). From 1964 to 1971, he played Abner Kravitz, the long-suffering neighbor on the ABC sitcom Bewitched.  Tobias often appeared in an uncredited role as a courtroom spectator on the CBS program Perry Mason, and he played Sidney Falconer in the episode titled "The Case of the Antic Angel" (1964).

In 1972-1973, Tobias appeared in three episodes of The Waltons as junkman Vernon Rutley.

Tobias never married and retired from acting in 1977 after reprising his role as Abner Kravitz in a guest appearance on the Bewitched sequel Tabitha.

Personal life
A Democrat, he supported Adlai Stevenson during the 1952 presidential election.

On February 27, 1980, Tobias died of Bladder cancer at the age of 78 at Cedars Sinai Medical Center in Los Angeles. He is buried in Mount Carmel Cemetery, Glendale, Queens, New York City.

Work

Theater
Broadway productions:
What Price Glory? (1924)
The International (1928)
The Road to Rome (1928)
The Grey Fox (1928)
Red Dust (1928)
S. S. Glencairn (1929)
Fiesta (1929)
Sailors of Cattaro (1934)
Black Pit (1935)
Paths of Glory (1935)
Hell Freezes Over (1935)
Star Spangled (1936)
You Can't Take It with You (1936)
Good Hunting (1938)
Silk Stockings (1955)

Complete filmography

The Lunatic (1927)
Yes, My Darling Daughter (1939) as Dock Worker (uncredited)
Maisie (1939) as Rico
They All Come Out (1939) as "Sloppy Joe"
The Roaring Twenties (1939) as Soldier in American Army Barracks (uncredited)
Ninotchka (1939) as Soviet Visa Official (uncredited)
Balalaika (1939) as Slaski
The Hunchback of Notre Dame (1939) as Beggar
Music in My Heart (1940) as Sascha
Saturday's Children (1940) as Herbert Smith
Torrid Zone (1940) as Rosie La Mata
The Man Who Talked Too Much (1940) as Slug "Canvasback" McNutt
They Drive by Night (1940) as George Rondolos
River's End (1940) as Andrew "Andy" Dijon
The Baron and the Rose (1940, Short) as Henry Stiegel
Calling All Husbands (1940) as Oscar Armstrong
City for Conquest (1940) as Pinky
East of the River (1940) as Tony Scaduto
South of Suez (1940) as Eli Snedeker
The Strawberry Blonde (1941) as Nicholas Pappalas
Affectionately Yours (1941) as Pasha
Out of the Fog (1941) as Igor Propotkin
Sergeant York (1941) as Private Michael T. "Pusher" Ross
The Bride Came C.O.D. (1941) as Peewee Defoe
The Tanks Are Coming (1941, Short) as Malowski
Captains of the Clouds (1942) as Blimp Lebec (bush pilot)
Yankee Doodle Dandy (1942) as Dietz
Juke Girl (1942) as Nick Garcos
Wings for the Eagle (1942) as Jake Hanso
My Sister Eileen (1942) as Appopolous
Air Force (1943) as Asst. Crew Chief Weinberg
Mission to Moscow (1943) as Freddie
This Is the Army (1943) as Maxie Twardofsky
Thank Your Lucky Stars (1943) as himself
Passage to Marseille (1944) as Petit
Between Two Worlds (1944) as Pete Musick
Make Your Own Bed (1944) as Boris Fenilise
Objective, Burma! (1945) as Cpl. Gabby Gordon
Mildred Pierce (1945) as Mr. Chris (uncredited)
Her Kind of Man (1946) as Joe Marino
Nobody Lives Forever (1946) as Al Doyle
Gallant Bess (1946) as Lug Johnson
Sinbad the Sailor (1947) as Abbu
My Wild Irish Rose (1947) as Nick Popoli
The Judge Steps Out (1948) as Mike
Adventures of Casanova (1948) as Jacopo
The Set-Up (1949) as Tiny
Everybody Does It (1949) as Rossi
Southside 1-1000 (1950) as Reggie
Rawhide (1951) as Gratz
The Mark of the Renegade (1951) as Captain Bardoso
The Magic Carpet (1951) as Razi
Ten Tall Men (1951) as Londos
 Desert Pursuit (1952) as Ghazili
The Glenn Miller Story (1953) as Si Schribman
The Seven Little Foys (1954) as Barney Green
The Tattered Dress (1957) as Billy Giles
Silk Stockings (1957) as Vassili Markovitch
Marjorie Morningstar (1958) as Maxwell Greech
Hudson's Bay (1959-1960) as series regular Pierre Falcon
A New Kind of Love (1963) as Joe Bergner
Bullet for a Badman (1964) as Diggs
Nightmare in the Sun (1965) as Gideon
The Glass Bottom Boat (1966) as Mr. Fenimore
The Phynx (1970) as Markevitch
Tora! Tora! Tora! (1970) as Captain on Flight Line at Hickam Field (uncredited)

References

External links

 
 George Tobias at Turner Classic Movies 
 
 

1901 births
1980 deaths
American male film actors
American male television actors
American male stage actors
American people of Russian-Jewish descent
Jewish American male actors
Deaths from cancer in California
Deaths from bladder cancer
Male actors from New York City
Male actors from Los Angeles
20th-century American male actors
California Democrats
New York (state) Democrats
20th-century American Jews